The West Indies cricket team toured New Zealand in February and March 1969 and played a three-match Test series against the New Zealand national cricket team. The series was drawn 1–1.

Test series summary

First Test

Second Test

Third Test

References

1968 in West Indian cricket
1968 in New Zealand cricket 
1969 in West Indian cricket
1969 in New Zealand cricket 
New Zealand cricket seasons from 1945–46 to 1969–70
1968-69
International cricket competitions from 1960–61 to 1970
1968 in cricket 
1969 in cricket